Admiral Evans may refer to:

Alfred Evans (Royal Navy officer) (1884–1944), British Royal Navy vice admiral
Charles Evans (Royal Navy officer) (1908–1981), British Royal Navy vice admiral
Edward Evans, 1st Baron Mountevans (1880–1957), British Royal Navy admiral
John Evans (Royal Navy officer) (1717–1794), British Royal Navy admiral
Marsha J. Evans (born 1947), U.S. Navy rear admiral
Robley D. Evans (admiral) (1846–1912), U.S. Navy rear admiral
Stephen C. Evans (born 1963), U.S. Navy rear admiral

See also
Edward Evans-Lombe (1901–1974), British Royal Navy vice admiral